Let the Truth Be Told is the debut album by Irish recording artist Laura Izibor. It was released on 8 May 2009, under Atlantic Records.

Background
At the age of 15, Izibor was signed to Jive Records. She dropped out of school to record the album. From ages 17 to 18, Izibor recorded over half of the album. After a dispute with the Jive, she signed with Atlantic Records and subsequently moved to New York City after her mentor, Steve Lunt, was offered a job at the label.

Recording
Let the Truth Be Told was recorded from 2005 to 2009; recording sessions took place in her hometown of Dublin, Ireland, to New York City, Atlanta and Philadelphia. Upon the album's UK release, noted R&B writer Pete Lewis of the award-winning 'Blues & Soul' stated "Anchored firmly in classic R&B, it effectively combines a reverence for the tradition of vintage, warm piano-driven soul with a fresh twist of modern sensibility. As can be heard on tracks ranging from the funky, uplifting 'From My Heart to Yours' and intense, groove-driven 'Don't Stay'; to the sincere, aching love lament 'If Tonight Is My Last'." The song "Shine" was originally written for The Nanny Diaries, but was added to the album after being pushed back several times.

Track listing
All songs were written by Laura Izibor.

Deluxe edition bonus tracks

Personnel

 Jo Archard – strings
 Iyiola Babalola – programming
 Andre Bowman – bass
 Jarrett Boyd – background vocals
 Ciaran Byrne – engineer
 David Campbell — string arrangements (track 2)
 Jeff Chestek – string engineer
 Tom Coyne – mastering
 Mark Crown – brass
 Jack Daley – bass
 Jonnie Davis "Most" – mixing
 Darius de Haas – background vocals
 Graham Dominy – engineer
 Tim Donovan – mixing
 Rachelle Dupéré – art direction, design
 John Ellis and His SDB – keyboards
 Paul Bryan Farr – guitar
 Serban Ghenea – mixing
 Larry Gold – string arrangements, string conductor
 Rob Gold – art manager
 David Harrigan – design
 Tommy Hayes – assistant engineer
 Marva Hicks – background vocals
 Laura Izibor – piano, arranger, vocals, background vocals, producer, executive producer, string arrangements

 Scott Jacoby – organ, bass, drums, Clavinet, producer, engineer, string arrangements, drum programming, mixing, Wurlitzer
 Tyrone Johnson – bass, guitar
 Joseph Joubert – organ, piano, arranger
 Craig Kallman – executive producer
 Edison Waters – executive producer
 Zev Katz – bass
 Jong On Oakki Lau – strings
 Darren Lewis – programming
 Cora Venus Lunny – violin, viola
 Steve Lunt – percussion, producer, executive producer, shaker, string arrangements, A&R
 P. Magnet
 Michael McElroy – choir arrangement
 Ken McHugh – vocal engineer
 Joi L. Pitts – marketing
 Gavin Ralston – guitar, programming, engineer
 Steven Wolf – drums, programming
 Brian Ranney – package production
 Clare Raybould – strings
 Tim Roberts – mixing assistant
 Saunders Sermons – trombone
 Chris Stang – marketing
 Billy Jay Stein – engineer, Wurlitzer, Hammond B3
 Chris "Tricky" Stewart – producer
 Phil Tan – mixing
 Peter "Real Strings" Whitfield – string arrangements

Charts

Release history

References

2009 debut albums
Albums produced by Tricky Stewart
Atlantic Records albums
Laura Izibor albums